Bollettone is a mountain in Lombardy, Italy. It has an elevation of 1317 metres.

Mountains of the Alps
Mountains of Lombardy